Hakola is a surname. Notable people with the surname include:

 Juha Hakola (born 1987), Finnish footballer
 Kimmo Hakola (born 1958), Finnish composer
 Lauri Hakola (born 1979), Finnish ski jumper
 Ristomatti Hakola (born 1991), Finnish cross-country skier
 Theo Hakola (born 1954), American musician and writer